Reginald Percy Gaddum (28 July 1898 – 1957) was a tea planter in Ceylon  and a member of parliament from 1952 to 1956.

Reginald Percy Gaddum was born in 1898 at Gona Adika Estate in Gampola, the son of George Percy and Jessie Doris. His father was an Englishman who had arrived in Ceylon in 1891. Gaddum began his planting career as a "creeper" at the age of 15 years. In 1935 he became the youngest Chairman of the Planters' Association of Ceylon, a position in which he served for three years. On 30 April 1938 he was appointed as a member of the 2nd State Council of Ceylon, following the resignation of Evelyn Charles Villiers. In 1939, he became a director of a commercial firm and resigned from the State Council on 10 January.

Gaddum was a keen sportsman, especially in tennis where he teamed up with his brother-in-law to win the national doubles title in three successive years in the early 1920s.

During the First World War he served as a squadron leader of the Royal Air Force.

Gaddum was a nominated member of the second Parliament (1952-1956). He ended his career as Managing Director of Aitken Spence.

Gaddum married Doreen Eleanor née Burmester at St. Paul's Church, Kandy, they had five daughters, Elizabeth Jessie (1923–1990), Moyra Eleanor (1924–2012), Patricia Benita (1926–2013), Shelagh Ann (1928–2004) and Ruth Phoebe (1933–2015).

Notes

References 

1898 births
1957 deaths
Members of the 2nd State Council of Ceylon
Members of the 2nd Parliament of Ceylon
Members of the 3rd Parliament of Ceylon
Sri Lankan people of English descent
People from British Ceylon